Brennan & Carr is a roast beef sandwich shop in Sheepshead Bay, Brooklyn open since 1938. It appeared on Man v. Food (season 2).

Their Roast Beef sandwich has been named one of the “23 Iconic Dishes to Try in New York” and is the city’s answer to  “LA’s fabled French dipped sandwiches.”

One of the signatures of Brennan & Carr is their beef broth, which consists of the leftover drippings from the oven-roasted beef, poured into a heated vat, and is then used as part of the sandwich-making process. 

Regular customers know of 3 separate varieties of broth to use with their ordered sandwich: The "Dingle-Dangle", which is just the beef of the sandwich dipped into the broth, leaving the roll dry; the "Double Dip", where the entire sandwich is dipped into the broth; and the "K.F.J.", or "Knife and Fork Job", where an entire ladleful of broth is poured onto the entire sandwich, making the result so messy, customers have to use a knife and fork to eat it.

References

Restaurants in Brooklyn
Roast beef restaurants in the United States
Sheepshead Bay, Brooklyn